Emily Savitri Haines (born 25 January 1974) is a Canadian singer and songwriter. She is the lead singer, keyboardist and songwriter of the rock band Metric and a member of the musical collective Broken Social Scene. As a solo artist, she has performed under her own name and as Emily Haines & The Soft Skeleton. Haines possesses the vocal range of a mezzo-soprano.

Early life
Born in New Delhi, and raised in Fenelon Falls, Ontario, Haines is a dual citizen of Canada and the United States (her parents were both born in the US). She is the daughter of Canadian poet Paul Haines; her mother founded a school for under-privileged children in India. Her middle name, Savitri, is from Savitri: A Legend and a Symbol, an epic poem by Sri Aurobindo. Her sister is the Canadian television journalist Avery Haines and her brother is Tim Haines, owner of Bluestreak Records in Peterborough, Ontario, Canada.

Haines grew up in a house rich with experimental art and musical expression and her early influences included Carla Bley, Robert Wyatt, and PJ Harvey. She studied drama at the Etobicoke School of the Arts (ESA), where she met Amy Millan and Kevin Drew, with whom she would later collaborate in Broken Social Scene (co-founded by Drew). During their time at ESA, Haines and Millan formed their first band together.

Haines attended the University of British Columbia in Vancouver between 1992 and 1993, and Montreal's Concordia University between 1995 and 1996. In 1996, she distributed a limited-edition album entitled Cut in Half and Also Double that included songs written and recorded during her student years.

Professional music

Haines met James Shaw in Toronto in 1997 and began performing as a duo called "Mainstream". After releasing an EP entitled Mainstream EP, they changed the band's name to "Metric", after a sound programmed by Shaw on his keyboard. Joshua Winstead and Joules Scott-Key joined the band in 2001. 
As of 2022, Metric has released eight studio albums: Old World Underground, Where Are You Now? (2003), Live It Out (2005), Grow Up and Blow Away (2007, but recorded in 2001), Fantasies (2009), Synthetica (2012), Pagans in Vegas (2015), Art of Doubt (2018), and Formentera (2022).

Haines also contributed vocals or backing vocals to songs by Broken Social Scene, Jason Collett, Stars, Delerium, K-Os, KC Accidental, The Stills, Tiësto, The Crystal Method, Rezz, and Todor Kobakov.

In 2004, Metric appeared in the 2004 drama film Clean. The band, appearing as themselves, performed their song "Dead Disco" and had minor speaking roles in a backstage scene. "Dead Disco" also featured on Clean Original Soundtrack. In 2010, she appeared as part of Broken Social Scene, on the soundtrack for the film This Movie is Broken.

In 2006, as Emily Haines & The Soft Skeleton, Haines released the studio album Knives Don't Have Your Back. The songs "Our Hell" and "Doctor Blind" were issued as singles and corresponding music videos were produced.  Following the release, Haines undertook a tour of North America in January 2007. Knives Don't Have Your Back was followed in 2007 by the EP What Is Free to a Good Home?, which was inspired by the death of her father.  Her solo work is typically more subdued and piano-based than her work with Metric. She often appears with Amy Millan as her opening act.

Prior to the fourth Metric album Fantasies, Haines traveled to Argentina to write. She became good friends with Lou Reed and Laurie Anderson before Reed's death in 2013.

Haines contributed to Broken Social Scene's 2017 album Hug of Thunder and performed with Broken Social Scene on The Late Show with Stephen Colbert 30 March 2017. In May 2017, Haines was with Broken Social Scene in Manchester, England, the night after the terror attack at the Ariana Grande concert; she attributes her ability to carry on and play after the attack to the support of former The Smiths guitarist Johnny Marr.

On September 15, 2017, Emily Haines & The Soft Skeleton released the album Choir of the Mind; it was recorded a year earlier in Toronto and released by Last Gang Records and eOne (Entertainment One). The album's lead single, "Fatal Gift", was released on 9 June 2017. In support of the album, Haines toured North America in late 2017.

Instruments
When performing with Metric, Haines plays two synthesizers. Her primary synthesizer is a Sequential Circuits Pro-One, which she has played since the band's early years. As secondary synthesizer, she played a Kawai MP9000, which was replaced by E-mu's PK-6 Proteus Keys in 2003, and was followed by the Clavia Nord Wave in 2012. She also plays the tambourine, electric guitar, piano and harmonica.

Other projects
In August 2013, Haines became involved with FLEET4HEARme, a collaboration with Fleet Jewelry and HearMe, an organization that aims to increase children's access to music programs in public schools. In September 2015, the Canadian outerwear brand Rudsak unveiled a leather jacket customized by Haines. The jacket is a classic black motor-cycle style with lyrics from Metric song "The Governess" on the back.

Metric is active in the international advocacy organization Global Citizen, and Haines is involved with its girls and women issues campaign #SheDecides. In 2017, Haines partnered with House of Matriarch High Perfumery to create her own fragrance, "Siren".

Discography

Emily Haines
Albums
Cut in Half and Also Double (1996)

Emily Haines & The Soft Skeleton
Albums
Knives Don't Have Your Back (2006, No. 28 in Canada)
Choir of the Mind (2017, No. 42 in Canada)

EPs
What Is Free to a Good Home? (2007)

Singles
"Doctor Blind"
"Our Hell" 
"Fatal Gift"
"Statuette"

Music videos
"Doctor Blind"
"Our Hell"
"Fatal Gift"
"Planets"
"Statuette"
"Legend of the Wild Horse"

Metric

Albums
 Old World Underground, Where Are You Now? (2003)
 Live It Out (2005)
 Grow Up and Blow Away (2007)
 Fantasies (2009)
 Synthetica (2012)
 Pagans in Vegas (2015)
 Art of Doubt (2018)
 Formentera (2022)

Collaborations
The following songs are credited with Emily Haines on either lead or backing vocals:

Filmography
Clean (2004, as herself)
This Movie Is Broken (2010, performing with Broken Social Scene)

Guest appearances
Cameo appearance on the k-os music video, "Man I Used to Be".
Cameo appearance on The Stills music video for "Love and Death" playing a secretary.
Stars in Julian Plenti's music video for the song "Games For Days".
Stars in Jason Collett music video for the song "Fire".

References

Other sources
 Chan, Alvin. "Emily Haines – Pop Princess Sharpens her Knives". MusicOMH.com. . Accessed 28 July 2008.
Sweeny, Joey. "Indie Pop Goes Twee".  The Rock History Reader. Ed. Theo Cateforis New York: Routledge, 2007.

External links

1974 births
Living people
Canadian women rock singers
Canadian women singer-songwriters
Canadian pop pianists
Canadian people of American descent
People from Kawartha Lakes
Musicians from Ontario
Singers from Delhi
University of British Columbia alumni
Concordia University alumni
Canadian indie rock musicians
Canadian new wave musicians
Canadian indie pop musicians
Broken Social Scene members
Tambourine players
Feminist musicians
Rock harmonica players
Best Original Song Genie and Canadian Screen Award winners
Canadian women in electronic music
20th-century Canadian keyboardists
21st-century Canadian keyboardists
20th-century Canadian pianists
21st-century Canadian pianists
Canadian mezzo-sopranos
Canadian feminists
20th-century Canadian women singers
Canadian women pianists
21st-century Canadian women singers
21st-century drummers
Metric (band) members
Grönland Records artists
20th-century women pianists
21st-century women pianists